Thomas Nicoll Hepburn (21 April 1861 – 1 September 1930) was a Scottish poet and author who wrote under the pseudonym of Gabriel Setoun. 
He wrote poems such as 'Jack Frost', 'Romance' and 'The World's Music.' He also wrote novels in the 'Kailyard school' style such as Barncraig and Robert Urquhart (1896).

Biography
He was born on 21 April 1861 in West Wemyss, Fife. His father, Alexander Hepburn was a tailor. He died in London around September 1930.

Some Published Works 
 The Child World, London: Bodley Head, 1893.
 Barncraig: Episodes in the Life of a Scottish Village, London: J. Murray, 1893.
 Sunshine and Haar: Some Further Glimpses of Life at Barncraig, London: J. Murray, 1895
 Robert Urquhart, London: Bliss Sands and Foster, 1896.
 Robert Burns, Edinburgh: Oliphant, Anderson and Ferrier, 1896, ("Famous Scots Series")
 George Malcolm, London: Bliss Sands & Co, 1897.
 The Skipper of Barncraig, London: A. Constable & Co., 1901.

References

External links
 
 

1861 births
People from Fife
Scottish novelists
Scottish biographers
Scottish poets
1930 deaths